Transkripsi is the thirteenth studio album from Malaysian pop singer-songwriter Siti Nurhaliza and has been touted as Malaysia's Best Album of 2006. It also hailed as Siti's best album ever. The album was released on 23 April 2006 in Malaysia, Singapore and Brunei and at a later time in Indonesia. Siti performed the first single, "Biarlah Rahsia", at the Anugerah Planet Muzik in 2006 which was aired live from Singapore, weeks before the actual release date. The album features of what Siti describes as "the assemble of emotions or feelings which combined as one for as long as we live". The album has sold over 80 thousand copies. The album has been nominated for the Best Vocal Performance in an Album (Female), Best Album Cover and Best Music Video, won Best Pop Album and Best Album at the Anugerah Industri Muzik in 2007.

This album became Siti Nurhaliza's first album to be produced by her own company, Siti Nurhaliza Productions after she left Suria Records in 2005, but Suria Records remains as the distributor of her albums until Tahajjud Cinta.

Track listing

Charts

Album

Singles

Awards

2007

Notes

2006 albums
Siti Nurhaliza albums
Albums produced by Siti Nurhaliza
Suria Records albums
Malay-language albums